The Alaska Chilkat Bald Eagle Preserve is a state park and wildlife refuge in the U.S. state of Alaska near Haines. Established in 1982, the park covers 49,320 acres (199.6 km2), mainly along the Chilkat River, with sections along the Klehini and Tsirku rivers.

The preserve is home to the world's largest concentration of bald eagles. 200 to 400 birds live there year-round, with up to 4,000 observed during the annual Fall Congregation.

The Haines Highway from miles 12–18 (km 19–29) is a popular viewing location.

See also
List of Alaska state parks

External links
Division of Parks and Outdoor Recreation - Alaska Chilkat Bald Eagle Preserve 
Alaska Dept. of Fish and Game, Division of Wildlife Conservation - Alaska Chilkat Bald Eagle Preserve

Further reading
Bugliosi, Edward F. (1988).  Hydrologic reconnaissance of the Chilkat River basin, southeast Alaska: with special reference to the Alaska Chilkat Bald Eagle Preserve [U.S. Geological Survey Water-Resources Investigations Report 88-4023].  Anchorage:  U.S. Dept. of the Interior, U.S. Geological Survey.

State parks of Alaska
Protected areas of Haines Borough, Alaska